The 1903 Kentucky Derby was the 29th running of the Kentucky Derby. The race took place on May 2, 1903 and offered a purse of $6,000.

Full results

 Winning Breeder: Johnson N. Camden Jr.; (KY)

Payout
 The winner received a purse of $4,850.
 Second place received $700.
 Third place received $300.

References

1903
Kentucky Derby
Derby
1903 in American sports
May 1903 sports events